Falshomelix unicolor is a species of beetle in the family Cerambycidae, and the only species in the genus Falshomelix. It was described by Stephan von Breuning in 1956.

References

Pachystolini
Beetles described in 1956
Taxa named by Stephan von Breuning (entomologist)